Iskushuban is a small town in the northeastern Bari province of Somalia on the Horn of Africa. A historical settlement, it is situated in the autonomous Puntland state. It lies along the 50th meridian east.

Overview

Iskushuban is the centre of the Iskushuban District. It lies 80 km east of Qardho and 150 km south of Bosaso, the commercial capital of the Puntland region.

In the Arie valley, midway between the town and Qardho, once lay a sizeable city that had considerable structures with thick walls.

Iskushuban is renowned for its seasonal waterfalls, which are the second largest in the country after those at Lamadaya in the northern Sanaag region.

Demographics
Iskushuban has a population of around 7,000 inhabitants. The broader Iskushuban District has a total population of 45,027 residents.

Education
Iskushuban has a number of academic institutions. According to the Puntland Ministry of Education, there are 8 primary schools in the Iskushuban District. Among these are Timirshe, Meeladeen, Gargoore and Iskushuban Primary.

Sites
Sites in Iskushuban:

Notes

References
Iskushuban

Populated places in Bari, Somalia